The Hope House, at 1112 Gillespie Place in Garden City, Kansas, was built in 1908.  It was listed on the National Register of Historic Places in 2000.

It is a one-and-a-half-story bungalow with narrow clapboard siding, on a cement stone block foundation, and faces north.  It was built for F. E. McCombs, a cashier at a bank, by contractor Lew Krebs.

References

External links

Houses on the National Register of Historic Places in Kansas
Houses completed in 1908
Finney County, Kansas
Bungalow architecture in Kansas